Azeem Ghumman (born 24 January 1991) is a Pakistani cricketer. He is a right-handed batsman, who also played for Pakistan Under-19 team.
 
He has plenty of experience for a first-class cricketer, having played 19 games before the Under-19 World Cup in New Zealand. The highlight of his career before the tournament had been a sparkling 199 for Hyderabad; he was also the highest run-getter against Zimbabwe Under-19 in a one-day series, scoring 248 runs at an average of 41.33.

He has played in the 2005/06 Pentangular Cup tournament for the National Bank of Pakistan, who were the champions.

In September 2019, he was named in Balochistan's squad for the 2019–20 Quaid-e-Azam Trophy tournament.

His father, Shahnawaz Ghumman, was a film star, who acted in more than 200 movies and was killed on 25 June 1991 for political reasons.

References

External links
 

https://www.pcb.com.pk/player-detail.php?action=view_profile&player_id=23836

Pakistani cricketers
Living people
1991 births
Cricketers at the 2010 Asian Games
Asian Games medalists in cricket
Cricketers from Hyderabad, Sindh
Sui Northern Gas Pipelines Limited cricketers
Hyderabad (Pakistan) cricketers
Sui Southern Gas Company cricketers
Asian Games bronze medalists for Pakistan
Medalists at the 2010 Asian Games
21st-century Pakistani people